Gloom is the debut album of American extreme metal band Macabre, released in 1989. Several versions of this album exist. Some versions include the Grim Reality EP, other include a few live tracks and two songs from the Grim Reality EP.

Track listing
 "Embalmer"
 "Trampled to Death" - The Who concert disaster
 "Holidays of Horror" - Ronald Gene Simmons
 "Fritz Haarmann the Butcher" - Fritz Haarmann
 "Evil Ole Soul" - Joachim Kroll
 "Harvey Glatman (Your Soul Will Forever Rot)" - Harvey Murray Glatman
 "McMassacre" - James Huberty
 "David Brom Took an Axe" - David Brom
 "Cremator" - Marcel Petiot
 "Nostradamus" - Nostradamus
 "I Need to Kill" - Joseph Kallinger
 "Ultra Violent"
 "Rat Man"
 "Hey Laurie Dann" - Laurie Dann
 "Patrick Purdy Killed Five and Wounded Thirty" - Patrick Purdy
 "Exhumer"
 "Dr. Holmes (He Stripped Their Bones)" - Herman Mudgett
 "The Green River Murderer (He's Still out There)" - Gary Ridgway
 "Funeral Home"
 "Disease" ¹ 
 "Natural Disaster" ¹
 "What the Heck Richard Speck (Eight Nurses You Wrecked)" ²
 "Ultra Violent" ²
 "Funeral Home" ²
 "Mr. Albert Fish (Was Children Your Favorite Dish?)" ²
 "Fritz Haarmann the Butcher" ²
 "Killing Spree" ²

¹ Taken from Grim Reality
² Recorded live in April 1986

Credits
 Corporate Death - guitars, vocals
 Nefarious - bass guitar, vocals
 Dennis The Menace - drums

1989 debut albums
Macabre (band) albums